In enzymology, an UDP-arabinose 4-epimerase is an enzyme that catalyzes the chemical reaction

UDP-L-arabinose  UDP-D-xylose

Hence, this enzyme has one substrate, UDP-L-arabinose, and one product, UDP-D-xylose.

This enzyme belongs to the family of isomerases, specifically those racemases and epimerases acting on carbohydrates and derivatives.  The systematic name of this enzyme class is UDP-L-arabinose 4-epimerase. Other names in common use include uridine diphosphoarabinose epimerase, UDP arabinose epimerase, uridine 5'-diphosphate-D-xylose 4-epimerase, and UDP-D-xylose 4-epimerase.  This enzyme participates in nucleotide sugars metabolism.

References

 

EC 5.1.3
Enzymes of unknown structure